India competed at the 2014 Asian Games in Incheon, South Korea, from 19 September to 4 October 2014. After 16 years India won the gold medal in Asian Games men's hockey tournament, and consequently earned a direct berth to the 2016 Summer Olympics hockey tournament.

Medal table

Medalists

Archery

Men

Recurve

Compound

Women

Recurve

Compound

Athletics

Men

Track & road events

Field events

Women 

Track & road events

Field events

Note: India's Manju Bala (Hammer Throw) was upgraded to silver after gold medalist failed dope test

Combined events – Heptathlon

Badminton

Singles

Doubles

Team

Basketball

Men
Joginder Singh
Narender Kumar Grewal
Akilan Pari
Prakash Mishra
Pratham Singh
Vishesh Bhriguvanshi
Amrit Pal Singh
Prasanna Venkatesh
Pal Preet Singh Brar
Amjyot Singh
Yadwinder Singh
Rikin Pethani

Qualifying round
Group B

|}

Preliminary round
Group E

|}

Women
Akanksha Singh
Rajapriyadharshini Rajaganapathi
Raspreet Sidhu
Smruthi Radhakrishnan
Kavita Akula
Stephy Nixon
Poojamol Kochuparambu Subhashmon
Shireen Vijay Limaye
Jeena Skaria
Kavita Kumari
Prashanti Singh
Kruthika Lakshman

Quarterfinal

5-8 Placement round

5/6 Placement round

Boxing

Men

Women

Canoeing

Men

Sprint

Qualification Legend: 1/3 to Final, 4/7 + next BT to SF, Rest out

Obstacle Slalom

Women

Sprint

Qualification Legend: 1/3 to Final, 4/7 + next BT to SF, Rest out

Obstacle Slalom

Cycling

Men

Women

Equestrian

Eventing

Show Jumping

Dressage

Field hockey

Men
P. R. Shreejesh
Gurbaj Singh
Birendra Lakra
Rupinder Pal Singh
Kothajit Singh
V. R. Raghunath
Dharamvir Singh
Sardar Singh
Danish Mujtaba
Chinglensana Singh Kangujam
Manpreet Singh
Ramandeep Singh
Akashdeep Singh
S. V. Sunil
Gurwinder Singh Chandi
Nikkin Thimmaiah

Preliminary
Group B

Semifinal

Final

Women
Savita
Deep Grace Ekka
Deepika
Sunita Lakra
Namita Toppo
Jaspreet Kaur
Sushila Chanu
Monika
Ritu Rani
Lilima Minz
Amandeep Kaur
Chanchan Devi Thokchom
Rani Rampal
Poonam Rani
Vandana Kataria
Navjot Kaur

Preliminary
Group A

Semifinal

Bronze-medal match

Football

Men

Amrinder Singh
Ravi Kumar
Pritam Kotal
Keenan Almeida
Joyner Lourenco
Shankar Sampingiraj
Sandesh Jhingan
Narayan Das
Pronay Halder
Rowllin Borges
Clifton Dias
Alwyn George
Lalrindika Ralte
Francisco Fernandes
Seminlen Doungel
Sunil Chetri
Robin Singh
Thongkhosiem Haokip
Mandar Rao Desai

Preliminary
Group G

Women

Okram Roshini Devi
Aditi Chauhan
Pushpa Tirkey
Ashem Romi Devi
Ashalata Devi
Tuli Goon
Radharani Devi
Suprava Samal
Umapati Devi
Premi Devi
Amoolya Kamal
Mandakini Devi
Oinam Bembem Devi
Kamala Devi
Sasmita Malik
Prameshwori Devi
Dangmei Grace
Bala Devi

Preliminary
Group A

Golf

Men

Women

Gymnastics

Men
Qualifying

Finals

Women
Qualifying

Finals

Handball

Men

Nitin Kumar Sharma
Atul Kumar
Sachin Kumar
Lalit T Kumar
Binu Vasu
Greenidge Sing D Cun
Satish Panwar
Avin Khatkar Khelkar
Manpret Singh Bassi
Sunil
Manish Kumar
Mahesh Ugale
Hardev Singh
Firoz Ahmed Khan
Rajvinder Kaur

Group D

Women

Tintu Abraham
Anumit
Deepa
Indu Gupta
Gurmail Kaur
Gurpreet Kaur
Maninder Kaur
Manisha
Varuni Negi
Preeti
Priyanka
Rajwant Kaur
Rimpi
Ritu
Sanjeeta
Sonia

Group A

Judo

Kabaddi

Men
Rakesh Kumar
Surjeet Singh
Navneet Gautam
Ajay Thakur
Jasvir Singh
Anup Kumar
Gurpreet
Rajguru
Nitin Madne
Surjeet Narwal
Praveen
Manjeet Chillar
Preliminary round

Group A

Semifinal

Final

Women
Tejeswari Bai
Mamatha Poojari
Priyanka
Abhilasha Mahatre
Sumitra Sharma
Jayanthi
Kavita
Kavita Devi
Anita Mavi
Kishori Shinde
Pooja Thakur
Sushmita Powar
Preliminary round

Group A

Semifinal

Final

Rowing

Men

Qualification Legend: F=Final; FA=Final A (medal); FB=Final B (non-medal); R=Repechage

Women

Qualification Legend: FA=Final A (medal); FB=Final B (non-medal); R=Repechage

Sailing

Men

Women

Open

Sepaktakraw

Men

Women

Shooting

Men
Rifle

Hariom Singh
Joydeep Karmakar
Pistol

Vijay Kumar
Mahaveer Singh
Shotgun

Mairaj Ahmad Khan
Arozepal Sandhu
Parampal Singh Guron
Ankur Mittal
Mohd Asab
Sangram Dahiya

Women
Rifle

Pistol

Shotgun

Arti Singh
Rashmee Rathore
Varsha Varman

Squash

Singles

Team

Swimming

Men

Table tennis

Singles

Doubles

Team

Taekwondo

Men

Women

Tennis

Singles

Doubles

Team

Volleyball

Men
Vaishnav Govindrajan Ramakrishnan
Navjit Singh
Lamveet Katraria
Naveen Raja Jacob Maninduran
Prabagaran
Dilip Khoiwal
Mandeep Singh
Gurinder Singh
Jirom Vinith Charles
Ukkrapandian Mohan
Ranjit Singh
Kanagaraj Sivasubramanian
Preliminary

Group C

|}

|}

Quarterfinal Final

Women
Soumya
Rekha S.
Nirmala
Reshma P P
Sheeba P. V.
Preeti Singh
Tiji Raju
Poornima M.S.
Ansuri Ghosh
Terin Antony
Srutimon N.
Priyanaka Khadar
Preliminary

Group A

|}

|}

Weightlifting

Men

Women

Wrestling

Men
Freestyle

Greco-Roman

Women
Freestyle

Wushu

Men
Changquan

Nangquan/Nangun

Sanda

Women
Changquan

Sanda

Preparation and sponsorships
The Gujarat Cooperative Milk Marketing Federation, that manages dairy cooperative Amul, announced its memorandum of understanding (MoU) with the Indian Olympic Association on 11 July 2014. This MoU has made Amul the official sponsor of the Indian contingent at the 2014 Asian Games and Commonwealth Games, which was held in Glasgow, Scotland.

References

Nations at the 2014 Asian Games
India at the Asian Games
2014 in Indian sport